Michael Zelniker is a Canadian actor, director, and screenwriter. He is best known for his performance as Red Rodney in Clint Eastwood's Academy Award-winning film Bird (1988) and as Doug Alward in The Terry Fox Story (1983), for which he won a Genie Award for Best Supporting Actor at the 5th Genie Awards in 1984.

Early life and education 
Originally from Montreal, Quebec, Zelniker studied acting and theatre at Dawson College, Dome Theatre.

Career 
Zelniker appeared in the films Pinball Summer (1980), Ticket to Heaven (1981), Heartaches (1981), Bird (1988), Glory Enough for All (1991), Naked Lunch (1991), Queens Logic (1991),Mercenary (1996) and Snide and Prejudice (1997), and made guest appearances in the television series The Littlest Hobo, In the Heat of the Night, Murder, She Wrote, Profiler, Strong Medicine, The Dead Zone and Millennium.

He wrote the screenplay for the 1998 film Stuart Bliss, in which he also played the title character. Stuart Bliss was also produced by Zelniker, and won the Northampton Film Festival's Best of Fest Award in 1998.

Zelniker wrote, produced, and directed Falling, which won Indie Fest USA International Film Festival's Best of Festival Award in 2012. In 2013 he began teaching Acting for Film, Chekhov Technique and Performing Shakespeare at the Los Angeles Campus of the New York Film Academy after teaching Acting for the Camera, Acting Technique and Shakespeare at the American Musical and Dramatic Academy from 2004 to 2013.

In 2018, Zelniker became a climate leader with the Climate Reality Project, trained by former Vice President Al Gore. He served as the Co-Chair of Climate Reality's Los Angeles Chapter from 2018 - 2021. He wrote, produced, edited and directed the documentary, The Issue with Tissue - a boreal love story about the boreal forest and the Indigenous Peoples who have called it home for thousands of years. The Issue with Tissue held its world premiere at Cinéfest Sudbury International Film Festival on September 18, 2022.

Filmography

Film

Television

References

External links

Best Supporting Actor Genie and Canadian Screen Award winners
Canadian male film actors
Canadian male television actors
Canadian male screenwriters
Canadian male stage actors
Dawson College alumni
Male actors from Montreal
Living people
Writers from Montreal
Year of birth missing (living people)